The National Development Finance Corporation (NDFC) was a corporation owned by the Government of Pakistan, with the original main purpose of providing financing to public enterprises. Later its objectives were expanded to also provide financing to private enterprises as well. It was created in 1973 through an Act passed by the Parliament of Pakistan, under the premiership of Zulfikar Ali Bhutto. It was amalgamated into the National Bank of Pakistan, by the regime of General Pervez Musharraf in 2001.

References

Government-owned companies of Pakistan
Banks of Pakistan
2001 mergers and acquisitions
Defunct government departments and agencies of Pakistan
1973 establishments in Pakistan
2001 disestablishments in Pakistan
Government of Zulfikar Ali Bhutto
Pakistani companies disestablished in 2001
Pakistani companies established in 1973